Matheus Felipe Camargo Iacovelli (born 13 March 1998 in Rio de Janeiro) is a Brazilian professional footballer.

References

External links

Matheus Iacovelli at ZeroZero

1998 births
Living people
Brazilian footballers
Brazilian expatriate footballers
Association football midfielders
Campeonato Brasileiro Série A players
Liga Portugal 2 players
Ukrainian Premier League players
Sociedade Esportiva Palmeiras players
G.D. Estoril Praia players
Real S.C. players
Paraná Clube players
Operário Futebol Clube (MS) players
FC Lviv players
Expatriate footballers in Portugal
Brazilian expatriate sportspeople in Portugal
Expatriate footballers in Ukraine
Brazilian expatriate sportspeople in Ukraine
Footballers from Rio de Janeiro (city)